Cleo was a three-member South Korean girl group, formed in 1999. The name of the group cleo is the acronym of Come Listen EveryOne. They were one of the original Korean idol girl groups and were active at the same time as Fin.K.L and S.E.S. Their debut song "Good Time", from their first studio album, was very successful. The group's second album, released in 2000, was also successful and included the songs "Ready For Love", "Always in My Heart", and "Mosun" (lit. "Contradiction"). Cleo's third album, which included the song "Triple", was released in 2001. Their fourth album was released in 2003, included the tracks "Donghwa" (lit. "Fairy Tale") and "S.P.Y". Their fifth album, Rising Again, was released in 2004 and included the song "In and Out". The group disbanded in 2005.

In November 2011, the three original members reunited to appear on an episode of SBS Plus' Comeback Show Top 10. In June 2016, Jung Ye-bin (now using her real name, Kong Seo-young), Chae Eun-jung, and Kim Ha-na appeared on Two Yoo Project Sugar Man, performing "Good Time".

Members
 Kim Ha-na (김하나)
 Park Ye-eun (박예은)
 Chae Eun-jung (채은정)
 Han Hyun-jung (한현정)
 Jung Ye-bin (정예빈)

Timeline

Discography

Studio albums

Music videos

Notes

References

1999 establishments in South Korea
Musical groups established in 1999
Musical groups from Seoul
K-pop music groups
South Korean dance music groups
South Korean girl groups
South Korean musical trios
Musical groups disestablished in 2005